Consort Wan may refer to:

Imperial consorts with the surname Wan
Wan Zhen'er (1428–1487), concubine of the Chenghua Emperor
Consort Chen (Yingzong) (1431–1467), concubine of Emperor Yingzong of Ming

Imperial consorts with the title Consort Wan
Dowager Noble Consort Wan (1717–1807), concubine of the Qianlong Emperor
Noble Consort Wan (Xianfeng) (1835–1894), concubine of the Xianfeng Emperor

See also
Consort Wang (disambiguation)